Norwegian Government Security and Service Organisation (G.S.S.O)  is a Government agency responsible for a number of operative administration services for the Ministries of Norway. With about 750 employees, it offers services within archives, wages, accounting, web sites, purchasing, security, the state budget, and technology. It is subordinate to the Norwegian Ministry of Government Administration and Reform and was created as merger of the administrative divisions of each ministry.

References

Government agencies of Norway
Government agencies established in 1979
Organisations based in Oslo